Muriel Lester (9 December 1883 – 11 February 1968) was born in Leytonstone (now in east London, but then a prosperous Essex suburb) and grew up at Loughton, where she was a member of the Union Church. She was a social reformer, pacifist and nonconformist.

Biography
Muriel Lester was a daughter of Henry Lester, a Baptist businessman, president of the Essex Baptist Union and chairman of West Ham school board.
She was baptized in 1898, at 15. In Loughton, she lived with her parents at The Grange, and afterwards acquired a wooden house, Rose Cottage, which she renamed Rachel Cottage, and used as a holiday home for East-end children.

She was responsible, along with her sister Doris Lester, for Kingsley Hall, named after her brother who died young, aged 26.

In 1934 she became Ambassador-At-Large and afterwards Traveling Secretary for the International Fellowship of Reconciliation.

Lester accompanied Mahatma Gandhi on his tour of earthquake-shaken regions in Bihar on his anti-untouchability tour during 1934. He stayed at Kingsley Hall, the Lesters' foundation at Bow. There is a blue plaque to the Lester sisters on the cottage, no.49 Baldwins Hill, Loughton, which they acquired after The Grange and Rachel Cottage were sold for flats. This second cottage had previously been occupied by Sir Jacob Epstein.

During the Spanish Civil War Muriel Lester was an active pacifist. She is pictured at a pacifist conference in 1936, standing fourth from the left of the photograph, in the Wikipedia entry for José Brocca. In his book White Corpuscles in Europe (1939) the American writer Allan A. Hunter viewed the close of the Spanish Civil War and the opening of World War II from across the Atlantic, and despite the desolate outlook in Europe saw some grounds for optimism in the work of humanitarians including Muriel Lester.

Muriel Lester retired from full-time work in 1958 and in 1963 she became a Freeman of the Borough of Poplar on her eightieth birthday. She was recognized as one of the world's leading pacifists and The Nobel Prize organisation believes she may have been nominated for the Nobel Peace Prize at some point prior to the Second World War. (Records of nominees were not kept prior to 1939.) The since renamed Muriel Lester Cooperative House at the University of Michigan was named after her.

Family
Lester is the aunt of George Hogg. They travelled together to Japan in 1937, from where Hogg continued to Shanghai and later the Chinese hinterlands; he subsequently became famous for saving 60 orphaned boys, marching them 1,100 km to safety.

See also
 List of peace activists

References

Autobiographies
 It Occurred to Me (Autobiography), Harper Brothers, 1937
 It So Happened, Harper Brothers, 1947

Notes
 Ambassador of Reconciliation. A Muriel Lester Reader, edited by Richard Deats, Santa Cruz (CA), New Society Publishers, 1991.
 Jill Wallis, Mother of World Peace. The life of Muriel Lester, Hisarlik Press, 1993. 
 Allan A. Hunter, (1939) White Corpuscles in Europe (foreword by Aldous Huxley), Chicago and New York, Willett, Clarke and Company, pp 49–58.
 Devi Prasad, (2005) War is a Crime Against Humanity (foreword by George Willoughby), London, War Resisters' International, pp 89,522,523.
 The Match Girl and the Heiress (2014) by Seth Koven. A study of Nellie Dowell (1876-1923) and Muriel Lester.

External links
 Quotes From Muriel Lester's book Entertaining Gandhi
 http://www.muriellester.org/
 Archive at the Bishopsgate Institute
 Archive at Swarthmore College Peace Collection
 BBC News Online
 MURIEL LESTER, 1883-1968 Baptist Saint?

1885 births
1968 deaths
20th-century Baptists
Baptist pacifists
Baptist socialists
English Baptists
English Christian pacifists
English Christian socialists
People from Leytonstone
People from Loughton
Female Christian socialists